Puning Temple, may refer to:

Puning Temple (Hebei), in Chengde, Hebei, China.
Puning Temple (Jiangxi), in Yushan County, Jiangxi, China.

Buddhist temple disambiguation pages